Gebremedhin Haile (Amharic: ገብረመድህን ኃይሌ) is an Ethiopian football coach who has managed the Ethiopia national football team. Often, he is referred to as 'Gebre'.

Club career

Coaching Defence Force S.C. from the start of the 2011-12 Ethiopian Premier League, he vacated his position upon expiry of his contract in July 2016. Gebremedhin took Defence Force S.C. to three Ethiopian Cup finals, winning two.
When managing Defence Force S.C. in 2014, he was banned for five matches for obtrusively yelling at a referee for not giving an opposing defender a red card for what he saw as violent play. The two had to be restrained to prevent the fight to escalate

In January 2017 Haile was hired as the manager of Jimma Aba Buna. In August 2018 Haile was hired to be the manager of Mekelle City FC. In 2021, Haile was hired as the manager of Sidama Coffee S.C.

Ethiopia National Team

Taking over from the sacked Yohannes Sahle in May 2016, it was decided he was to be interim coach for a short term-from May to October 9, 2016.

His first game adverse to Lesotho, he beat them 2-1 before facing Seychelles in his last game at Ethiopia's helm.

Dismissed from national team manager duties in late 2016, he was replaced by Ashenafi Bekele.

References

Living people
Ethiopia national football team managers
Ethiopian football managers
Defence Force S.C. managers
Association football forwards
Ethiopian footballers
Ethiopia international footballers
Year of birth missing (living people)